Gerville Reyes-Luistro, also known as Jinky Bitrics Luistro or Bitrics, is a Filipina politician and lawyer serving as the Representative of Batangas's 2nd congressional district since 2022.

Political career

Municipal Administrator of Mabini
Luistro served as the Municipal Administrator of Mabini, Batangas during the mayorship of her husband Noel Luistro.

House of Representatives
In 2022, Luistro ran for representative of the 2nd district of Batangas under the Nationalist People's Coalition and won. She defeated the daughter of outgoing representative Raneo Abu, Dra. Reina Abu of Nacionalista Party and Atty. Nicasio "Nick" Conti of the PDP-Laban. She switched party from Nationalist People's Coalition to Lakas–CMD.

Personal life
Gerville Luistro is married to Noel Luistro, who served as mayor of Mabini from 2016 to 2022.

References

Living people
Members of the House of Representatives of the Philippines from Batangas
People from Batangas
Nationalist People's Coalition politicians
Lakas–CMD politicians
21st-century Filipino lawyers
Filipino women lawyers
21st-century Filipino women politicians
21st-century Filipino politicians
Year of birth missing (living people)